Events from the year 2005 events.

Incumbents

Federal government 
 President: George W. Bush (R-Texas)
 Vice President: Dick Cheney (R-Wyoming)
 Chief Justice: William Rehnquist (Wisconsin) (until September 3), John Roberts (New York) (starting September 29)
 Speaker of the House of Representatives: Dennis Hastert (R-Illinois)
 Senate Majority Leader: Bill Frist (R-Tennessee)
 Congress: 108th (until January 3), 109th (starting January 3)

Events

January 

 January 1 – President George W. Bush delivers a radio address on the Indian Ocean tsunami relief efforts.
 January 3 – President George W. Bush is joined by former Presidents George H. W. Bush and Bill Clinton in the Roosevelt Room as he announces that the two former presidents will be involved with the humanitarian response to the tsunami across the region of South and Southeast Asia.
 January 6 – The US Congress certifies the victory of President George W. Bush and Vice President Dick Cheney despite the objection of Ohio's electoral votes by Ohio congresswoman Stephanie Tubbs Jones and California senator Barbara Boxer. It was the first objection to a state's electoral votes since 1969.
 January 12 – Deep Impact is launched from Cape Canaveral by a Delta II rocket.
 January 20 – President George W. Bush and Vice President Dick Cheney begin their second term.
 January 22 – Fox Box, Fox's Saturday morning programming block owned by 4Kids Entertainment, is rebranded as 4Kids TV.
 January 26 – Glendale train crash: Two trains derail in Glendale, California, killing 11 and injuring 200.
 January – Mosdeux, a deaf owned film studio is established.

February 
 February 2 – State of the Union Address.
 February 6
 Super Bowl XXXIX: The New England Patriots win their second consecutive Super Bowl title, defeating the Philadelphia Eagles by a score of 24–21.
 American Dad! debuts on FOX, right after Super Bowl XXXIX.
 February 10 – North Korea announces that it possesses nuclear weapons as a protection against the hostility it feels from the United States.
 February 14 – The Internet site YouTube goes online.
 February 16 – The Kyoto Protocol goes into effect, without the support of the United States and Australia.
 February 21 – Avatar: The Last Airbender premieres on Nickelodeon.
 February 24 – David Hernandez Arroyo goes on a shooting rampage at the Smith County Courthouse in Tyler, Texas. He kills two, including his ex-wife, and injures four people, before being killed in a police chase.
 February 25 – Wichita, Kansas police apprehend the "BTK" serial killer Dennis Rader, 31 years after his first murder.
 February 27 – The 77th Academy Awards, hosted by Chris Rock, are held at Kodak Theatre in Hollywood, with Clint Eastwood's Million Dollar Baby winning Best Picture and Best Director, Eastwood's second win for both. Martin Scorsese's The Aviator wins five awards out of 11 nominations. The telecast garners over 42.1 million viewers.

March 

 March 1 – Roper v. Simmons: The Supreme Court of the United States rules that the death penalty is unconstitutional for juveniles who committed their crimes before the age of 18.
 March 4 – The car of released Italian hostage Giuliana Sgrena is fired on by U.S. soldiers in Iraq, causing the death of one passenger and injuring two more.
 March 11 – Three people, including a judge, are murdered in the Fulton County Courthouse in Atlanta, Georgia; the main suspect, Brian Nichols, surrenders to police the next day.
 March 12 – Terry Ratzmann opens fire during a church sermon in New Berlin, Wisconsin, killing seven and injuring four before taking his own life.
 March 21 – Ten are killed in the Red Lake shootings in Minnesota by teenager Jeff Weise, who commits suicide after a shootout with police. It is the worst school shooting since the Columbine High School massacre.
 March 23 – The United States' 11th Circuit Court of Appeals refuses (by a vote of 2–1) to stop the euthanasia of Terri Schiavo, who has been in a vegetative state since 1990, by not ordering the reinsertion of her feeding tube.
 March 24 – The Office debuts on NBC.
March 31 – Terri Schiavo dies at the age of 41 in Pinellas Park, Florida.

April 
 April 8 – Fever Pitch, a film starring Jimmy Fallon and Drew Barrymore documenting the Boston Red Sox 2004 World Series run, is released.
 April 9 – Tens of thousands of demonstrators, many of them supporters of Shia cleric Moqtada Sadr, march through Baghdad denouncing the U.S. occupation of Iraq, two years after the fall of Saddam Hussein, and rally in the square where his statue was toppled in 2003.
 April 30 – Newsweek alleges that American interrogators and guards have desecrated the Qur'an in attempts to rattle Islamic detainees.

May 
 May 8 - Two Denver Police Department officers are shot by a Mexican national, leading to an international incident over the extradition of the shooter.
 May 10 – A hand grenade ostensibly thrown by Vladimir Arutinian lands about 100 feet (30 m) from United States President George W. Bush while he is giving a speech to a crowd in Tbilisi, Georgia, but the explosive malfunctions and does not detonate.
 May 13
 The United States Department of Defense issues a list of bases to be closed as part of the Base Realignment and Closure process (BRAC 2005).
 Serial killer Michael Bruce Ross becomes the first person executed in New England in 45 years.
 May 16 – George Galloway appears before a United States Senate committee to answer allegations of making money from the Iraqi Oil-for-Food Programme.
 May 19 – Star Wars: Episode III – Revenge of the Sith is released in theaters.
 May 21 – Kingda Ka at Six Flags Great Adventure opens to the public, becoming the fastest and tallest roller coaster in the world at the time.
 May 25 – Carrie Underwood wins season 4 of American Idol
 May 31 – W. Mark Felt reveals himself to be the Watergate scandal whistleblower called "Deep Throat."

June 

 June 2 – The construction of Northrop Grumman X–47B, the world's first unmanned surveillance attack aircraft that can operate from both land bases and aircraft carriers, begins.
 June 17 – Because of "quadruple-witching" options and futures expiration, the New York Stock Exchange sees the heaviest first-hour trading on record. 704 million shares are traded between 9:30–10:30 a.m. (1.92 billion shares for the day).
 June 23 – The social news site Reddit launches.
 June 24 – A Volna booster rocket carrying the first light sail spacecraft (a joint Russian-United States project) fails 83 seconds after its launch, destroying the spacecraft.
 June 30 – The Dominican Republic–Central America Free Trade Agreement (CAFTA) is passed by the United States.

July 
 July 4
 The Italy–USA Foundation is established in Rome, Italy.
 NASA's "Copper bullet" from the Deep Impact spacecraft hits Comet Tempel 1, creating a crater for scientific studies.
 July 8 – Fantastic Four, directed by Tim Story, is released as the first film in the Fantastic Four film series.
 July 10 – Hurricane Dennis strikes near Navarre Beach, Florida as a Category 3 storm. The storm kills 88 people and causes $4 billion in damages.
 July 19 – President Bush nominates John Roberts to the U.S. Supreme Court to fill a vacancy that would be left by the resignation of Justice Sandra Day O'Connor.
 July 24 – Lance Armstrong wins a record 7th straight Tour de France before his scheduled retirement. In 2012 he will be disqualified from each of those races and banned from cycling for life for doping offenses by the United States Anti-Doping Agency (USADA).
 July 26 – STS–114 launches as the first "Return to Flight" Space Shuttle mission following the Space Shuttle Columbia disaster in 2003.

August 

 August 2 – The Dominican Republic–Central America Free Trade Agreement (CAFTA) is signed into law in the United States.
 August 9 – Space Shuttle Discovery returns to Edwards Air Force Base at 0814 EDT, completing STS–114, "Return to Flight".
 August 12 – The Mars Reconnaissance Orbiter is launched.
 August 23 – Hurricane Katrina forms over the Bahamas.
 August 29–August 30 – At least 1,836 are killed, and severe damage is caused along the U.S. Gulf Coast, as Hurricane Katrina strikes coastal areas from Louisiana to Alabama, and travels up the entire state of Mississippi (flooding coast ), affecting most of eastern North America. Katrina becomes the costliest hurricane in U.S. history with $108 billion in damages. The New Orleans Saints football team will play their entire 2005 season on the road due to the effects of the hurricane.

September 

 September – The largest evacuation in Houston history takes place as millions evacuate from Hurricane Rita.
 September 1 – Oil prices rise sharply following the economic effects of Hurricane Katrina.
 September 3 – Chief Justice William Rehnquist dies at 80 of anaplastic thyroid cancer, creating a vacancy on the Supreme Court.
 September 5 – John Roberts is nominated by President George W. Bush for Chief Justice of the United States, replacing William Rehnquist, who had died two days previously. Roberts was previously nominated to fill the seat of retiring Justice Sandra Day O'Connor, but given the circumstances of Rehnquist's death, O'Connor remains on the Court until her successor is confirmed.
 September 14–September 16 – The largest UN World Summit in history is held in New York City.
 September 20 – The NFL sees the groundbreaking ceremony for two new stadiums, the Indianapolis Colts' Lucas Oil Stadium ($720 million) and the Dallas Cowboys' temporarily named Cowboys Stadium ($1.15 billion).
 September 23 – Convicted bank thief and Boricua Popular Army leader, Filiberto Ojeda Ríos, is killed in his home in Hormigueros, Puerto Rico when members of the FBI attempt to serve an arrest warrant.
 September 24
 Worldwide protests occur against the Iraq War, with over 150,000 protesters in Washington, D.C. (see Opposition to the Iraq War).
 Hurricane Rita hits the U.S. Gulf Coast, devastating areas near Beaumont, Texas and Lake Charles, Louisiana. The Ninth Ward of New Orleans re-floods since Katrina, and Mississippi and Alabama are also affected. The storm kills 120 people and causes $12 billion in damages.
 September 26
 U.S. Army Reservist Lynndie England is convicted by a military jury on six of seven counts in connection with the Abu Ghraib prisoner abuse scandal.
 Sprout (now Universal Kids) is launched by a joint venture between PBS, Comcast, HIT Entertainment, and Sesame Workshop. The new network replaces PBS Kids, allowing for an initial reach of 16.5 million subscribers.
 DT Racer is released on the PlayStation 2, developed by Axis Entertainment and published by XS Games.
 September 28 – United States House Majority Leader Tom DeLay (R–Texas) is indicted on charges of criminal conspiracy by a Texas grand jury. 
 September 29 – John Roberts is confirmed and sworn in as the 17th Chief Justice of the United States.

October 
 October 1
 An Australian photojournalist in Afghanistan, Stephen Dupont, films U.S. soldiers burning two dead Taliban militias' bodies.
 The United States housing bubble begins to burst, causing home prices to stop rising unexpectedly and begin to decline.
 October 2
 The first regular-season NFL game played outside of the US pits the San Francisco 49ers against the Arizona Cardinals at Estadio Azteca in Mexico City, Mexico. The Cardinals win by a score of 31–14.
 A tour boat capsizes on Lake George, New York killing 20 of 47 aboard.
 October 3
 U.S. President George W. Bush nominates Harriet Miers to replace Associate Justice Sandra Day O'Connor. 
 St. Tammany Parish schools reopen in Louisiana, just over a month after Hurricane Katrina.
 October 15 
 In college football, the USC Trojans narrowly defeat heavy underdogs Notre Dame Fighting Irish in an illegal play known as the Bush Push.
 A riot occurs in Toledo, Ohio during a neo-Nazi rally on racial issues; 114 are arrested.
 October 16 – U.S. helicopters and warplanes bomb two villages near Ramadi in western Iraq, killing about 70 people.
 October 19 – The Houston Astros win their first National League Championship, advancing to their first World Series in franchise history.
 October 24 
Hurricane Wilma makes landfall in southwestern Florida as a Category 3 hurricane. There are 23 direct dead, 39 indirect dead and $29.1 billion in damages.
Civil rights activist Rosa Parks, who made headlines when she refused to give up her seat in a Montgomery bus, dies of natural causes at the age of 92 in Detroit. She becomes the first woman to lie in honor in the United States Capitol rotunda.
 October 25 – The Chicago White Sox defeat the Houston Astros 7–5 in 14 innings in the first World Series game in the State of Texas to extend their lead to 3–0, putting them within one win of the Series. The game, which takes 5 hours and 41 minutes to complete, is the longest postseason game by time.
 October 26
 The Chicago White Sox beat the Houston Astros in four games to win their first World Series since 1917.
 The U.S. death toll in Iraq reaches 2,000.
 October 27 – After issues arise of her competency to adjudicate United States constitutional law, Harriet Miers withdraws her name from consideration for the Supreme Court of the United States.
 October 28 – Vice presidential adviser Lewis "Scooter" Libby resigns after being charged with obstruction of justice, perjury and making a false statement in the CIA leak investigation. 
 October 31
 U.S. President George W. Bush nominates federal appeals court judge Samuel Alito for Associate Justice of the Supreme Court of the United States.
 Astronomers announce the discovery of two additional moons orbiting the Pluto/Charon system. Subsequently, named Nix and Hydra, the moons have been found in images from the Hubble Space Telescope.

November 
 November 1
 United States Senate Minority Leader Harry Reid and his fellow Democrats force a closed session of the Senate over the Lewis Libby indictment.
 The Prince of Wales and the Duchess of Cornwall (Charles and Camilla) arrive in the United States for a state visit, their first overseas tour since their marriage.
 November 4
 The U.S. and Uruguay governments sign a Bilateral Investment Treaty.
 Walt Disney Pictures' 46th feature film, Chicken Little, Disney's first fully computer-animated film, is released to stronger box office success than most of the studio's most recent output, though it is one of their biggest critical flops.
 November 6 – Evansville Tornado of November 2005: A tornado hits western Kentucky and southwestern Indiana, killing 25 with $92 million in damages.
 November 20 – The Washington Post rebukes journalist Bob Woodward over his conduct in the CIA leak probe.

December 

 December – The unemployment rate falls below 5% for the first time since August 2001; it will remain below 5% until December 2007.
 December 7 – A U.S. federal air marshal fatally shoots Rigoberto Alpizar on a jetway at Miami International Airport in Florida.
 December 8 – Southwest Airlines Flight 1248 overshoots the runway at Chicago Midway Airport, killing a 6-year-old boy and injuring 11 other people.
 December 16 – The 43rd Mersenne prime is found, 230,402,457 − 1. It was discovered with the GIMPS project by Dr. Curtis Cooper and Dr. Steven Boone, professors at Central Missouri State University.
 December 20
2005 New York City transit strike: New York City's Transport Workers Union Local 100 goes on strike for three days, shutting down all New York City Subway and Bus services.
Angela Johnson becomes the first woman in 50 years to be sentenced to death by the United States federal government. She is convicted of five murders in Iowa, receiving the death penalty for four of them.
 December 23 – U.S. Secretary of Defense Donald Rumsfeld announces the first in an expected series of troop drawdowns following the Iraqi elections.

Undated 
Healing Through Creativity organization is founded.
Huron Valley State Bank is founded in Milford, Michigan.
Junk King, recycling company, is founded.
KookyCanuck, a Memphis, Tennessee restaurant, opens.
LucidEra, a business intelligence solution provider, is founded in California.
Magnus Choir, music software synthesizer, is released.
 Ten years after reaching the million mark, the U.S. prison population reaches 2.5 million inmates.

Ongoing 
 War in Afghanistan (2001–2021)
 Iraq War (2003–2011)

Births

January 

 January 3 – Marley Dias, activist
 January 4 – Robert Dillingham, basketball player
 January 8 – Collin Dean, actor
 January 10 – Josh Hardin, soccer player
 January 14 – Jesse Love, stock car racing driver
 January 18 – Isaie Louis, soccer player
 January 20
 Haroun Conteh, soccer player
 Glaive, musician
 January 21 – IShowSpeed, youtuber

February 

 February 1 – Konnor McClain, gymnast
 February 4 – Skye Blakely, gymnast
 February 8 – Katie Silverman, actress
 February 15 – Nicolas Bechtel, actor
 February 18 – Eden Wood, actress and reality television star
 February 20 – Gabriel Fernandez, murder victim (d. 2013) 
 February 21 – Sydney Barros, gymnast
 February 23
 Diego Hernandez, soccer player
 Arica Himmel, actress
 February 28 – Francis Jacobs, soccer player

March 

 March 1 – Felipe Valencia, soccer player
 March 10 – Esmir Bajraktarevic, soccer player
 March 11 – Riley Ann Sawyers, murder victim (d. 2007)
 March 18 – Sam Williams, soccer player
 March 25 – Taylor Gray, racing driver
 March 26 – Ella Anderson, actress 
 March 29 – Brooklyn Shuck, actress
 March 31 – Reed Baker-Whiting, soccer player

April 

 April 5 – Noel Buck, soccer player
 April 5, Noah Perez. son of Tejano Singer Chris Perez
 April 29
 Gavin Beavers, soccer player
 Shahadi Wright Joseph, actress

May 

 May 2
 Jak Crawford, racing driver
 Gregory Diaz IV, actor
 Joshua Wynder, soccer player
 May 3 – Maxwell Jenkins, actor
 May 4 – Dajuan Wagner Jr., basketball player
 May 5 – Emmanuel Ochoa, soccer player
 May 11 
 Ezra Frech, Paralympic athlete
 Hunter Yeany, racing driver
 May 12 – Ava Acres, actress
 May 18 – Alexandria Villaseñor, activist
 May 25 – Bella Sims, swimmer

June 
 June 3 – Francesca Corbett, badminton player
 June 27 – Miles Krajewski, para-badminton player

July 
 July 7 – Jesse Ray Sheps, actor
 July 9 – Serge Ngoma, soccer player
 July 12 – Issac Ryan Brown, actor
 July 20 – Alison Fernandez, actress
 July 25 – Pierce Gagnon, actor
 July 30 – Julio Benitez, soccer player

August 

 August 5 – Obed Vargas, soccer player
 August 8 – Alysa Liu, figure skater
 August 9 – Caylee Anthony, murder victim (d. 2008)
 August 10 – Sunny Suljic, actor

September 

 September 17 – Olivia Moultrie, soccer player
 September 26 – Jack Hoffman, notable brain cancer patient
 September 29 – Gabrielle Gutierrez, actress

October 
 October 1 – Rosalie Chiang, actress
 October 7 – Lulu Wilson, actress

November 
 November 9 – Diego Rosales, soccer player
 November 19 – Gitanjali Rao, scientist
 November 20 – Curtis Ofori, soccer player

December 
 December 10 – Kyliegh Curran, actress
 December 14 – Mia Sinclair Jenness, actress

Unknown 

 Connor Michalek, WWE fan who died of cancer (d. 2014)

Deaths

January 

 January 1
 Shirley Chisholm, American politician, educator and author (b. 1924)
 Eugene J. Martin, American artist (b. 1938)
 Bob Matsui, Japanese-American politician (b. 1941)
 January 2 
 Arnold Denker, American chess player (b. 1914)
 Maclyn McCarty, American geneticist (b. 1911)
 January 3 – Will Eisner, American cartoonist, writer and entrepreneur (b. 1917)
 January 4
 Guy Davenport, writer, artist and scholar (b. 1927)
 Robert Heilbroner, writer (b. 1919)
 Alton Tobey, artist (b. 1914)
 January 7 – Rosemary Kennedy, socialite (b. 1918)
 January 10 – James Forman, civil rights activist (b. 1928)
 January 11 – Spencer Dryden, rock drummer (b. 1938)
 January 15 – Ruth Warrick, singer, actress and political activist (b. 1916)
 January 17 – Virginia Mayo, actress (b. 1920)
 January 19 – Lamont Bentley, actor and rapper (b. 1973)
 January 20 – Roland Frye, theologian and critic (b. 1921)
 January 21 – Adrianne Leigh Reynolds, murder victim (b. 1988)
 January 23 – Johnny Carson, television host and comedian (b. 1925)
 January 25 – Philip Johnson, architect (b. 1906)
 January 28 – Lucien Carr, key member of the original New York City circle of the Beat Generation in the 1940s (b. 1925)

February 

 February 1 – John Vernon, Canadian actor (b. 1932)
 February 3 – Ernst Mayr, German-American evolutionary biologist (b. 1904)
 February 4 – Ossie Davis, American actor, director, poet, playwright, author and activist (b. 1917)
 February 5 – Bob Brannum, American basketball player (b. 1925)
 February 6
 Elbert N. Carvel, politician (b. 1910)
 Merle Kilgore, singer and songwriter (b. 1934)
 February 8
 Mike Bishop, American basketball player (b. 1958)
 George Herman, American journalist (b. 1920)
 Keith Knudsen, drummer (b. 1948)
 Jimmy Smith, jazz musician (b. 1925)
 February 10 – Arthur Miller, playwright and husband of Marilyn Monroe (b. 1915) 
 February 11 – Jack L. Chalker, American author and writer (b. 1944)
 February 12
 Brian Kelly, American actor (b. 1931)
 Sammi Smith, American country music singer-songwriter (b. 1943)
 February 13 – Nelson Briles, American baseball player (b. 1943)
 February 14 – Dick Weber, American boxer (b. 1929)
 February 14 – F. M. Busby, American author (b. 1921)
 February 15 – Samuel T. Francis, American Radical right columnist and writer.  (b. 1947)
 February 20
 Sandra Dee, actress (b. 1944)
 Hunter S. Thompson, journalist (b. 1937)
 February 24 – Hugh Nibley, American scholar and prominent member of the Church of Jesus Christ Latter-day Saints (b. 1910)
 February 25 – Ben Bowen, child cancer patient (b. 2002)
 February 26 – Jef Raskin, computer scientist (b. 1943)

March 

 March 6
 Hans Bethe, German-born physicist, Nobel Prize laureate (b. 1906)
 Teresa Wright, actress (b. 1918)
 March 9 – Chris LeDoux, rodeo performer and singer (b. 1949)
 March 13 – Lyn Collins, R&B singer (b. 1948)
 March 17 
 George F. Kennan, diplomat and political advisor (b. 1904)
 Andre Norton, writer (b. 1912)
 March 19 – John DeLorean, car maker (b. 1925)
 March 21
 Bobby Short, pianist and singer (b. 1924)
 Jeff Weise, American teenage mass murderer and spree killer (b. 1988)
 March 29
 Johnnie Cochran, American lawyer (b. 1937)
 Mitch Hedberg, American stand-up comedian (b. 1968)
 March 30
 Robert Creeley, American poet (b. 1926)
 Fred Korematsu, Japanese-American civil rights activist (b. 1919)
 March 31 – Terri Schiavo, right-to-die cause célèbre (b. 1963)

April 
 April 5 – Jack Keller, songwriter and producer (b. 1936)
 April 5 – Saul Bellow, writer (b. 1915)
 April 14 – Saunders Mac Lane, American mathematician (b. 1909)
 April 16 – Marla Ruzicka, activist, founder of Campaign for Innocent Victims in Conflict (b. 1976)
 April 19 – Ruth Hussey, actress (b. 1911)
 April 22 – Philip Morrison, physicist (b. 1915)
 April 26 – Mason Adams, actor (b. 1919)
 April 28 – Chris Candido, professional wrestler (b. 1972)

May 

 May 7 – Peter Wallace Rodino, politician (b. 1909)
 May 8 – Lloyd Cutler, attorney and Presidential advisor (b. 1917)
 May 13 – George Dantzig, mathematician (b. 1914)
 May 14 – Jimmy Martin, musician (b. 1927)
 May 16 – Eliza Jane Scovill, AIDS victim (b. 2001)
 May 17 – Frank Gorshin, American actor, impressionist and comedian (b. 1933)
 May 21 – Howard Morris, actor (b. 1919)
 May 22 – Thurl Ravenscroft, voice actor (b. 1914)
 May 26 – Eddie Albert, actor (b. 1906)

June 

 June 4 – Ronald F. Marryott, admiral (b. 1934)
 June 6
 Maurice Rabb Jr., ophthalmologist (b. 1932)
 Dana Elcar, actor (b. 1927)
 Anne Bancroft, actress and wife of Mel Brooks (b. 1931)
 June 7 - Terry Long, American football player (b. 1959)
 June 13 – Lane Smith, American actor (b. 1936)
 June 20
 Charles David Keeling, climate scientist (b. 1928)
 Jack Kilby, electronics engineer, Nobel Prize laureate (b. 1923)
 June 24 – Paul Winchell, ventriloquist, comedian, actor, voice artist, humanitarian and inventor (b. 1922)
 June 25
 Domino Harvey, British-American bounty hunter (b. 1969)
 John Fiedler, actor (b. 1925)
 June 27 – Shelby Foote, American historian and novelist (b. 1916)
 June 28
 Danny Dietz, American naval officer (b. 1980)
 Erik S. Kristensen, American naval officer (b. 1972)
 Michael P. Murphy, American naval officer (b. 1976)
 Stephen C. Reich, American 160th SOAR officer (b. 1971)

July 

 July 1 – Luther Vandross, singer, songwriter and record producer (b. 1951)
 July 4 
 June Haver, actress and singer (b. 1926)
 Hank Stram, football coach (b. 1923)
 July 5 – James Stockdale, admiral and vice presidential candidate (b. 1923)
 July 6
 Bruno Augenstein, German-American mathematician and physicist (b. 1923)
 L. Patrick Gray, FBI director (b. 1916)
 Ed McBain, screenwriter and crime fiction writer (b. 1926)
 July 9 – Kevin Hagen, television actor (b. 1928)
 July 11 – Frances Langford, radio and film actress and singer (b. 1913)
 July 14 – Joe Harnell, pianist and composer (b. 1924)
 July 16 – John Ostrom, paleontologist (b. 1928)
 July 18 – William Westmoreland, general (b. 1914)
 July 20 – James Doohan, Canadian actor (b. 1920)
 July 23 – Myron Floren, accordionist (b. 1919)
 July 25 – Ford Rainey, actor (b. 1908)
 July 26 – Jack Hirshleifer, economist (b. 1925)

August 
 August 1 – John Alevizos, businessman (b. 1919)
 August 2 – Jay Hammond, politician (b. 1922)
 August 8 – John H. Johnson, businessman and publisher. (b. 1918)
 August 9 – Matthew McGrory, screen actor noted for his height (b. 1973)
 August 16 – Joe Ranft, screenwriter, animator, storyboard artist and voice actor (b. 1960)
 August 17 – John Norris Bahcall, astrophysicist (b. 1934)
 August 21 – Robert Moog, pioneer of electronic music (b. 1934)
 August 23 – Brock Peters, actor (b. 1927)

September 

 September 1 – R.L. Burnside, American blues singer (b. 1926)
 September 2 – Bob Denver, American actor (b. 1935)
 September 3
 William Rehnquist, Chief Justice of the United States. (b. 1924)
 James Rossi, Olympic cyclist. (b. 1936)
 September 14 – Robert Wise, American film director (b. 1914)
 September 25
 Don Adams, American actor (b. 1923)
 Urie Bronfenbrenner, Russian-born American professor of psychology (b. 1917)

October 

 October 12 – Jack White, journalist and reporter (b. 1942)
 October 18 – Bill King, sports broadcaster (b. 1927)
 October 21
 Tara Correa-McMullen, actress (b. 1989)
 Alvin Neelley, murderer (b. 1953)
 October 22 – Arman, French-American artist (b. 1928)
 October 24 – Rosa Parks, civil rights activist (b. 1913)
 October 28 – Richard Smalley, chemist and physicist, Nobel Prize laureate (b. 1943)

November 

 November 1 – Michael Piller, American screenwriter and producer (b. 1948)
 November 4 – Sheree North, American actress, dancer and singer (b. 1932)
 November 12 – James Fyfe, criminologist and instructor (b. 1942)
 November 13 – Eddie Guerrero, Mexican-American professional wrestler (b. 1967)
 November 15 – Adrian Rogers, religious leader (b. 1931)
 November 16 – Henry Taube, Canadian-American chemist and academic, Nobel Prize laureate (b. 1915)
 November 18
 Harold J. Stone, American actor (b. 1913)
 Elias Syriani, Jordanian-born American convicted murderer (b. 1938)
 November 24 – Pat Morita, American actor (b. 1932)

December 

 December 2
 William P. Lawrence, admiral and pilot (b. 1930)
 Nat Mayer Shapiro, painter (b. 1919)
 December 10 – Richard Pryor, actor and comedian (b. 1940)
 December 14 – Stew Bowers baseball player (b. 1915)
 December 20 – Bradford Cannon, Boston plastic surgeon (b. 1907)
 December 21 – Elrod Hendricks, baseball player and coach (b. 1940)
 December 31
 Sanora Babb, writer (b. 1907)
 Enrico Di Giuseppe, operatic tenor (b. 1932)

See also 
 2005 in American soccer
 2005 in American television
 List of American films of 2005
 Timeline of United States history (1990–2009)

References

External links
 

 
2000s in the United States
United States
United States
Years of the 21st century in the United States